Ron Lester (August 4, 1970 – June 17, 2016) was an American actor. He was best known for his roles in the films Varsity Blues, Not Another Teen Movie, Good Burger, and the television series Popular.

Early life 
Lester was born in Kennesaw, Georgia.

Career 
Lester's first acting role came when he went to Atlanta, Georgia, to appear as an extra in a commercial, which turned into a feature part. He appeared in a music video for the band Little Texas.

Lester moved to Los Angeles and began doing stand-up comedy in comedy clubs. His first film role was in the movie Good Burger in 1997. In 1999 Lester played the role of Billy Bob in the film Varsity Blues, which would become the role he is most known for. That year he also had recurring roles on two TV drama comedies,  Freaks and Geeks and Popular. He also appeared in Not Another Teen Movie, portraying a character that was a parody of his role in Varsity Blues.

Personal life 
In 2000, Lester underwent a gastric bypass surgery procedure called Roux-en-Y gastric bypass with a duodenal switch, losing . During the procedure Lester flatlined. After the gastric bypass, he had 18 plastic surgeries to remove excess skin.

In September 2015, Lester was hospitalized due to issues with his liver and kidneys. In June 2016, he was reported to be in critical condition and in hospice care. At 9:00 PM on June 17, 2016, Lester died of liver and kidney failure shortly after his family requested that he be taken off life support. He was 45 years old.

Filmography

Film

Short films

Television

References

External links

Ron Lester - Find A Grave

1970 births
2016 deaths
People from Kennesaw, Georgia
American male film actors
American male television actors
Deaths from kidney failure
Male actors from Georgia (U.S. state)
Deaths from liver failure